Notre Dame Church and Goldsmith Memorial Chapel is a historic church located in Chippewa Falls, Wisconsin. On April 7, 1983, the site was added to the National Register of Historic Places. It is affiliated with the Roman Catholic Diocese of La Crosse.

History
The church was completed in 1872. Goldsmith Memorial Chapel was added in 1894. The church underwent other renovations in 1887 and again from 1904 to 1906.

References

Churches in the Roman Catholic Diocese of La Crosse
Churches on the National Register of Historic Places in Wisconsin
Roman Catholic chapels in the United States
Buildings and structures in Chippewa County, Wisconsin
Roman Catholic churches completed in 1872
Romanesque Revival church buildings in Wisconsin
National Register of Historic Places in Chippewa County, Wisconsin
19th-century Roman Catholic church buildings in the United States